Safwa is a city in the Eastern Province of Saudi Arabia situated on the Persian Gulf coast. Safwa has a population of about 100,000 people.
Safwa has a few government departments, public utilities, educational institutions and one health care center. People in Safwa work in various sectors such as; education, health care, banking, mining, oil and gas, and commerce. The city includes one of the most organized neighborhoods in the eastern region, Al-Zahra neighborhood (Urouba), which has more than 1,200 residential units and an area of 336 hectares.

References

External links
Official site

Populated places in Eastern Province, Saudi Arabia
Oases of Saudi Arabia